The 2019 Kiskút Open II was a professional tennis tournament played on indoor clay courts. It was the first edition of the tournament which was part of the 2019 ITF Women's World Tennis Tour. It took place in Székesfehérvár, Hungary between 21 and 27 October 2019.

Singles main-draw entrants

Seeds

 1 Rankings are as of 14 October 2019.

Other entrants
The following players received wildcards into the singles main draw:
  Anna Bondár
  Dalma Gálfi
  Réka Luca Jani
  Fanny Stollár

The following player received entry using a protected ranking:
  Susanne Celik

The following player received entry as a special exempt:
  Irina Bara

The following players received entry from the qualifying draw:
  Gréta Arn
  Marie Benoît
  Miriam Bulgaru
  Alexandra Cadanțu
  Maja Chwalińska
  Dorka Drahota-Szabó
  Ilona Georgiana Ghioroaie
  Victoria Kan

Champions

Singles

 Danka Kovinić def.  Irina-Camelia Begu, 6–4, 3–6, 6–3

Doubles

 Georgina García Pérez /  Fanny Stollár def.  Nina Potočnik /  Nika Radišič, 6–1, 7–6(7–4)

References

External links
 2019 Kiskút Open II at ITFtennis.com
 Official website

2019 ITF Women's World Tennis Tour
2019 in Hungarian tennis
October 2019 sports events in Europe